"Casabianca" is a poem by the English poet Felicia Dorothea Hemans, first published in The Monthly Magazine, Vol 2, August 1826.

The poem starts:

The boy stood on the burning deck
Whence all but he had fled;
The flame that lit the battle's wreck
Shone round him o'er the dead.

It is written in ballad meter, rhyming abab. It is about the true story of a boy who was obedient enough to wait for his father's orders, not knowing that his father is no longer alive. It is perhaps not widely realised that the boy in the poem is French and not English; his nationality is not mentioned.

History

The poem commemorates an actual incident that occurred in 1798 during the Battle of the Nile between British and French fleets on 1 August aboard the French flagship L'Orient. Giocante, the young son (his age is variously given as ten, twelve and thirteen) of the ship's commander Luc-Julien-Joseph Casabianca remained at his post and perished when at 22:00 the fire reached the magazine and the Orient was destroyed by a massive explosion which damaged nearby ships.

Narrative

In Hemans' and other tellings of the story, young Casabianca refuses to desert his post without orders from his father. (It is sometimes said, rather improbably, that he heroically set fire to the magazine to prevent the ship's capture by the British.) It is said that he was seen by British sailors on ships attacking from both sides but how any other details of the incident are known beyond the bare fact of the boy's death, is not clear. Hemans, not purporting to offer a history, but rather a poem inspired by the facts, writes:

Yet beautiful and bright he stood,
As born to rule the storm;
A creature of heroic blood,
A proud though child-like form.

The flames rolled on—he would not go
Without his Father's word;
That Father, faint in death below,
His voice no longer heard.

Hemans has him repeatedly, and heart-rendingly, calling to his father for instructions: "'say, Father, say/If yet my task is done?'" "'Speak, Father!' once again he cried/'If I may yet be gone! And'" at which point his voice is drowned out by "booming shots" until he "shouted but once more aloud/'My Father! must I stay?'" Alas, there is, of course, no response.

She concludes by commending the performances of both ship and boy:

With mast, and helm, and pennon fair,
That well had borne their part—
But the noblest thing which perished there
Was that young, faithful heart!

Textual error
In verse five, the incorrect line:
And"—but the booming shots replied,
is given correctly as:
And but the booming shots replied,
As noted above, the word 'And' is spoken.

Cultural impact
This poem was a staple of elementary school readers in the United Kingdom and the United States over a period of about a century spanning roughly the 1850s through the 1950s. It is today remembered mostly as a tag line and as a topic of parodies. Perhaps to justify its embedding in English-speaking culture, modern editors often claim French poets also celebrated the event – notably André Chénier and Ecouchard Lebrun – apparently without noticing that the former was executed four years before the Battle of the Nile, so could not have written about these events. These claims for literary pedigree appear spurious.

The story is referenced in Bram Stoker's Dracula. In chapter VII, in a newspaper account of a storm, the dead pilot of the ship Demeter is compared to "the young Casabianca.".

The mis-attribution of the poem serves as both a key plot device, and a running gag, in P.G. Wodehouse's The Luck of the Bodkins (1935).

In Ian Fleming's 1955 novel Moonraker, James Bond prepares to sacrifice himself to save London from a nuclear weapon.  He says, "The boy stood on the burning deck. I've wanted to copy him since I was five."

The first line of the poem serves as the title and the inspiration for the short story "The Boy Stood on the Burning Deck" by C. S. Forester.  In this version the hero, Ed Jones, remains at his station aboard the fictitious USS Boon during the Battle of Midway.  A fire started in the bilge beneath his station in the engine room, but Jones remained at his station slowly roasting while the battle rages. At the conclusion of the battle he is relieved by a damage control party. Burned, he nonetheless survives the war.

In Season 2, Episode 34 of The Rifleman, Mark McCain recites portions of the poem. He is memorizing it for a school assignment.

In Season 14, Episode 99 of The Bill, the character Frank Burnside recites the following parody of the poem:

The boy stood on the burning deck,
eating red hot scallops,
one fell down his trouser leg,
and burned him on the foot,
completely missed...(his bollocks).

The character's recital is cut off before he could say the word "bollocks".

In the 2011 film Tinker Tailor Soldier Spy, Peter Guillam is heard reciting the opening lines as he and George Smiley check microphones in a safe house.

In the book Swallowdale by Arthur Ransome, the Great Aunt is outmanoeuvered when she tasks Nancy and Peggy Blackett with learning the poem, without realising they already know it.

Parody
Generations of schoolchildren created parodies based on the poem. One, recalled by Martin Gardner, editor of Best Remembered Poems, went:

The boy stood on the burning deck,
The flames 'round him did roar;
He found a bar of Ivory Soap
And washed himself ashore.

Spike Milligan also parodied the opening of the poem:
The boy stood on the burning deck
Whence all but he had fled -
Twit! Of course he had to stay
And surround himself with dread.

Eric Morecambe created another parody:
The boy stood on the burning deck
His lips were all a-quiver
He gave a cough, his leg fell off
And floated down the river.

American modernist Elizabeth Bishop created a poem based on this poem called "Casabianca" too:
Love's the boy stood on the burning deck
trying to recite "The boy stood on
the burning deck." Love's the son
stood stammering elocution
while the poor ship in flames went down.

Love's the obstinate boy, the ship,
even the swimming sailors, who
would like a schoolroom platform, too,
or an excuse to stay
on deck. And love's the burning boy.

References

External links

Full text of the poem at UPenn's Celebration of Women Writers
 Original text of the poem: 

British poems
1826 poems
Works originally published in The Monthly Magazine
Poems about death
Historical poems
War poetry